Golrang "Rey" Garofano is an American politician serving as a member of the Vermont House of Representatives from the Chittenden-8-1 district. She was appointed to the House in January 2022.

Early life and education 
Garofano was born in Iran and moved to Los Angeles in the 1980s amid the Iran–Iraq War. She earned a Bachelor of Science degree in business management from Champlain College in 2014.

Career 
Prior to entering politics, Garofano owned a Persian restaurant and worked as an associate at the Creative Discourse Group, a consulting firm. Since 2007, she has worked for the Vermont Department for Children and Families. Garofano was appointed to the Vermont House of Representatives in January 2022 by Governor Phil Scott, succeeding Marybeth Redmond.

References 

Living people
Women state legislators in Vermont
Democratic Party members of the Vermont House of Representatives
American politicians of Iranian descent
Politicians from Los Angeles
Champlain College alumni
People from Essex, Vermont
Year of birth missing (living people)